Kishiktan or Kesektan is the center of the newly created Hesa Duwum Kohistan District in Kapisa Province, Afghanistan.

References

Populated places in Kapisa Province